The Kashkan Bridge (Persian: پل کشکان) is a historical bridge in Lorestan province, Iran. Its construction started in 999 CE during the reign of Badr ibn Hasanwayh, and took 10 years to complete.

Having a length of 320 meters, the bridge originally contained 12 arches, 9 of which remain to this day.

The bridge is enlisted in the Iran National Heritage List with the number 355.

References 

Bridges in Iran
Tourist attractions in Lorestan Province